John Cameron (1868 – unknown) was a Scottish footballer who played in the Football League for Stoke and also played for Liverpool during their inaugural 1892–93 season.

Career
Cameron played football with Renton before they were expelled from the league in September. He then moved south to Stoke in 1891. He played nine matches for Stoke during the 1891–92 season scoring four goals. He returned to Scotland at the end of the season to play for Hibernian.

However, on 7 May 1892, Cameron was signed by Liverpool for their inaugural season. He made his debut and scored twice on 3 September in an 8–0 win against Higher Walton in the Lancashire League. He went on to make a further 6 appearances in the league, scoring a further 2 goals, helping Liverpool finish top of the league. Cameron also played twice in the FA Cup, including a 9–0 win over Newtown, in which he scored the ninth goal. He also played 5 times for the Liverpool Reserves in the Liverpool and District League, scoring at least twice, as some of the scorers haven't been accounted. Cameron also played in 13 friendlies for Liverpool (including a benefit match for Daniel Kirkwood against Bootle), but did not score any goals. In May, at the end of the season, he moved back to Scotland to play for Musselburgh Thistle.

Career statistics
Source:

Notes

References

Scottish footballers
Association football forwards
Stoke City F.C. players
Liverpool F.C. players
Hibernian F.C. players
English Football League players
1868 births
Year of death missing
Renton F.C. players